Jan Claesz. (c. 1570 – 1618) was a painter from the Northern Netherlands.

Claesz. was probably born in Enkhuizen, where he was active during the years 1594–1618.

References

1570s births
1618 deaths
People from Enkhuizen
Dutch Golden Age painters
Dutch male painters